Michel Corriveau (born June 29, 1962) is a Canadian composer of film and television scores from Quebec. He has received multiple nominations and awards throughout his career for Canadian and international films and TV productions

Biography 

Based in Montreal, Michel Corriveau was raised in Grand-Mère, Quebec. His maternal grandfather, Philippe Filion, was an orchestral conductor for whom the main concert hall at the Centre des arts de Shawinigan in Shawinigan is named, and served as lieutenant chief of music for the Department of National Defense.<ref>Guy Arcand, "Biographie – Philippe Filion". Société d’histoire militaire mauricienne"].</ref>

His musical career started in 1986 when he joined Luba's band as a keyboardist and accordionist. At the same time, he worked on multiple projects with keyboardist Jean-Alain Roussel, including albums by Céline Dion, Corey Hart and Martine St-Clair.

Over the years, he composed the music for international advertising campaigns, including for McDonald's, and for over 50 Canadian and international movies and television series. He has received multiple nominations for his work at the Genie and Canadian Screen Awards, the Quebec Cinema (Jutra/Iris) Awards, the Gemini Awards and the Prix Gémeaux, as well as winning awards from the Société professionnelle des auteurs et des compositeurs du Québec and the Society of Composers, Authors and Music Publishers of Canada.

He now works with his son, Jérémie Corriveau.

In addition to his work in film and television, he has also released two albums as a composer of electroacoustic music, Omni (2014) and Omnitudes'' (2018).

Filmography

Films

Series

Awards

References

External links

1962 births
Living people
20th-century Canadian keyboardists
20th-century Canadian composers
21st-century Canadian composers
Canadian film score composers
Canadian television composers
Canadian male composers
French Quebecers
Musicians from Quebec
People from Shawinigan
Canadian rock keyboardists